In the 2011–12 season, JSM Béjaïa competed in the Ligue 1 for the 12th season, as well as the Algerian Cup. They competed in Ligue 1, the Algerian Cup and the Champions League.

Squad list
Players and squad numbers last updated on 18 November 2011.Note: Flags indicate national team as has been defined under FIFA eligibility rules. Players may hold more than one non-FIFA nationality.

Pre-season and friendlies

Competitions

Overview

{| class="wikitable" style="text-align: center"
|-
!rowspan=2|Competition
!colspan=8|Record
!rowspan=2|Started round
!rowspan=2|Final position / round
!rowspan=2|First match	
!rowspan=2|Last match
|-
!
!
!
!
!
!
!
!
|-
| Ligue 1

|  
| style="background:silver;"|Runners-up
| 10 September 2011
| 19 May 2012
|-
| Algerian Cup

| colspan=2| Round of 64 
| colspan=2| 30 December 2011
|-
| Champions League

| Preliminary round 
| First round
| 18 February 2012
| 10 April 2012
|-
! Total

Ligue 1

League table

Results summary

Results by round

Matches

Algerian Cup

Champions League

Preliminary round

First round

Squad information

Playing statistics

|-
! colspan=12 style=background:#dcdcdc; text-align:center| Goalkeepers

|-
! colspan=12 style=background:#dcdcdc; text-align:center| Defenders

|-
! colspan=12 style=background:#dcdcdc; text-align:center| Midfielders

|-
! colspan=12 style=background:#dcdcdc; text-align:center| Forwards

|-
! colspan=12 style=background:#dcdcdc; text-align:center| Players transferred out during the season

Goalscorers

Transfers

In

Out

References

JSM Béjaïa seasons
Algerian football clubs 2011–12 season